Marco Pissardo (born 8 January 1998) is an Italian footballer who plays as a goalkeeper for  club Novara.

Club career

Inter 
Born in Verbania, Pissardo is a youth exponent of Inter.

Loan to Varese 
On 17 August 2016, Pissardo was signed by Serie D side Varese on a season-long loan deal. On 4 September he made his debut in Serie D for Varese and he kept his first clean sheet in a 1–0 away win over Cuneo, one week later, on 11 September he kept his second clean sheet in a 1–0 home win over Caratese, one more week later, Pissardo was sent off with a red card in the 76th minute of a 1–0 away win over Inveruno. On 2 October he kept his third clean sheet in a 1–0 home win over OltrepòVoghera. Pissardo helped Varese to rech the play-off final, but the Varese lost 2–0 against Gozzano and he ended his loan to Varese with 33 appearances, 19 clean sheets and 27 goals conceded.

Loan to Monopoli 
On 11 July 2018, Pissardo was loaned to Serie C side Monopoli on a season-long loan deal. On 29 July he made his debut for Monopoli in a 5–3 match won at penalties after a 1–1 home draw against Piacenza in the first round of Coppa Italia. On 22 September, Pissardo made his debut in Serie C and he kept his first clean sheet in a 0–0 away draw against Potenza. On 6 October he kept his second clean sheet for Monopoli in a 0–0 home draw against Trapani. Ten days later he kept his third clean sheet for Monopoli, a 3–0 home win over Paganese. Pissardo helped the club to reach the play-offs, but Monopoli was eliminated by Reggina in the first round and he ended his loan to Monopoli with 38 appearances, 33 goals conceded and 14 clean sheets.

Arezzo 
On 5 July 2019, Pissardo joined to Serie C club Arezzo on an undisclosed fee and a 3-year contract. On 4 August, Pissardo made his debut for the club and he kept his first clean sheet in a 1–0 home win over Turris in the first round of Coppa Italia. Three weeks later, on 25 August, he made his league debut for Arezzo in a 3–1 home win over Lecco. On 15 September he was sent-off with a red card in the 92nd minute of a 1–1 away draw against Pergolettese. Ten days later, on 25 September, Pissardo kept his first clean sheet in Serie C, a 0–0 away draw against Como. On 27 October he kept his second clean sheet, in Serie C, in a 2–0 home win over Giana Erminio. One week later he received his second red card of the season in the 43rd minute of a 2–1 away defeat against Pontedera.

Loan to Lecco
After having made his seasonal debub with Arezzo, on 2 October 2020, Pissardo was loaned to Lecco for the 2020–21 season. On 11 November he made his debut for the club and he also kept his first clean sheet in a 1–0 home win over Novara. He became Lecco first-choice goalkeeper early in the season. On 19 December he kept his second clean sheet for Lecco in a 2–0 home win over Pro Vercelli, and one month later, on 17 January his third in a 0–0 away draw against AlbinoLeffe. Pissardo helped Lecco to reach the play-offs, however the club lost 4–1 against Grosseto in the first round, he didn't play that match because an injury. Pissardo ended his season-long loan to Lecco with 26 appearances, 20 goals conceded and 12 clean sheets.

Lecco
On 8 July 2021, he returned to Lecco on a permanent basis, signing a multi-year contract.

Novara
On 8 July 2022, he signed with Novara.

Career statistics

Club

Honours

Club 
Inter Primavera
 Torneo di Viareggio: 2015, 2018
 Coppa Italia Primavera: 2015–16
 Supercoppa Primavera: 2018
 Campionato Nazionale Primavera: 2017–18

References

External links 

1998 births
Living people
People from Verbania
Sportspeople from the Province of Verbano-Cusio-Ossola
Footballers from Piedmont
Italian footballers
Association football goalkeepers
Serie C players
Serie D players
Inter Milan players
S.S.D. Varese Calcio players
S.S. Monopoli 1966 players
S.S. Arezzo players
Novara F.C. players
Calcio Lecco 1912 players
Italy youth international footballers